Franco Pappalardo La Rosa (born in Giarre, 15 September 1941) is an Italian journalist, literary critic, and writer.
He graduated from Turin university. He has lived in Turin since 1963. He contributed to cultural pages of Giornale del Sud, L'Umanità and Gazzetta del Popolo, and to many dictionaries, as Dizionario della Letteratura Italiana (Milano, Tea, 1989), Grande Dizionario Enciclopedico-Appendice 1991 (Torino, Utet, 1991) and Dizionario dei Capolavori (Milano, Garzanti, 1994). Nowadays he contributes to many literary magazines, as Hebenon, Chelsea (New York) and L'Indice.
He edited the publication of some works written by contemporary Italian writers, as Stefano Jacomuzzi, Giorgio Bàrberi Squarotti, Emanuele Occelli, Francesco Granatiero and Angelo Jacomuzzi.
He took part in National and International Conferences on figures and aspects of contemporary poetry and fiction.
He edits I Colibrì (Edizioni dell'Orso), fiction library between journalism and literature. He is founding member and member of the Board of Governors of the International Association “Amici di Cesare Pavese”.

Poetry 

 Il cuore, la metropoli, Padova, Rebellato, 1969
 Ultime dalla Còlchide, Torino, L.G.C. Edizioni, 1978
 L'orma di Sisifo. Poesie (1962-2012). Preface by Giovanni Tesio, Achille e La Tartaruga, Torino, 2017 -

Fiction 

 Lo scorsone (story) on "Stampa Sera", Torino, A. 110, n. 139, 19 June 1978
 La tuta nuova (story), on "Lunarionuovo", A. III, n. 13, July – August 1981 (pp. 60–69)
 Il vero Antonello e altri racconti, Acireale, Lunarionuovo, 1985
 Passaggio notturno (story), on "Astolfo", A. Iv, n. 1, 1997
 Angelo, Torino, Ananke, 1999
 L'affaire Wolfgang, Benin-Grenoble, Èditions à la Croisée, 2006 (translation by Daniel Mandagot)
 Il caso Mozart, Roma, Gremese, 2009 (postface by Giorgio Bàrberi Squarotti)
 Rondò. Tre racconti, Milano, Mimesis, 2012 (critical note by Giovanni Tesio)
 Farandoletta. Un sogno in Sicilia, Torino, Achille e La Tartaruga, 2018 
 Il Melomane, ibidem, 2022, .

Literary critics 

 Cesare Pavese e il mito dell'adolescenza, Alessandria, Edizioni dell'Orso, 1996, (2° edition)
 Il filo e il labirinto: Gatto, Caproni, Erba, Torino, Tirrenia Stampatori Edit., 1997
 Lo specchio oscuro: Piccolo, Cattafi, Ripellino, Alessandria Edizioni dell'Orso, 2004 (2° edition)
 Angelo Jacomuzzi, La grotta d'Elia e altre poesie edite e inedite, Burolo, I Quaderni di Hebenon, 2005
 Viaggio alla frontiera del Non-Essere: la poesia di Giorgio Caproni, Alessandria, Edizioni dell'Orso, 2006 (2° edition)
 Il poeta nel “labirinto”: Luciano Erba, ibidem, 2006 (2° edition)
 Alfonso Gatto. Dal surrealismo d'idillio alla poetica delle “vittime”, ibidem, 2007 (2° edition)
 Il fuoco e la falena. Sei poeti del Novecento, ibidem, 2009.
 Cinque studi. Esemplari di narrativa italiana del Novecento (of: "Associazione indigenti" by Matteo Collura, "Caro Michele" by Natalia Ginzburg, "L'amore è niente" by Mario Lattes, "Il compagno" by Cesare Pavese, "Fratelli" and "Il custode" by Carmelo Samonà), Turin, Achille e La Tartaruga, 2015, 
 Le "storie" altrui. Narrativa italiana del penultimo Novecento (77 recensioni e interviste), Turin, Achille e La Tartaruga, 2016,

Critical essays 

 Tracce e spunti del pensiero vichiano nella produzione letteraria di Cesare Pavese, in AA. VV., Conference reports: “Il mestiere di scrivere. Cesare Pavese trent'anni dopo”, Comune di Santo Stefano Belbo, 1982
 Angelo Maria Ripellino, Dall'”Isola” alla Mitteleuropa, in AA. VV., Conference reports: “Angelo Maria Ripellno, poeta-slavista”, Acireale 9–12 December 1981, edited by Mario Grasso, Acireale, Lunarionuovo, V, nn. 21-22, 1983
 Una questione marginale: riflusso della poesia o poesia del riflusso?, in AA. VV., “Fare poesia oggi. Comunicazione, linguaggio, bisogni”. Conference reports, Alessandria 6-7–8 March 1981, edited by Giancarlo Bertolino, Alessandria, Il Quadrante, 1984
 Matteo Collura e Carmelo Samonà, in AA. VV., “Gli eredi di Verga”, National Conference reports, Randazzo 11–13 December 1983 (presentation by Giorgio Bàrberi Squarotti), Catania, Comune di Randazzo. 1984
 Un sogno di poesia: il “Nido” soave nei Mischigghi di Vincenzo Leotta, in AA: VV., “Operai di sogni. La poesia del Novecento in Sicilia”. National Conference reports, Randazzo 10–12 November 1984, edited and introduced by Giovanni Raboni, Catania, Comune di Randazzo, 1985
 La metafora e il labirinto: Giorgio Luzzi, in “Profili Letterari”, A. II, n. 3, November 1992
 “Caro Michele” o dell'inutilità delle parole, in AA. VV., International Conference reports: “Natalia Ginzburg. La casa, la città, la storia”, S. Salvatore Monferrato, 14–15 May 1993, edited by Giovanna Ioli, S. Salvatore Monferrato, Ediz. “Piemonte e Letteratura”, 1995 
 Angelo e Stefano Jacomuzzi, maestri e amici (in collaboration with Enrica di Giorgi Lombardo), Torino, Tirrenia Stampatori Editrice, 1997
 La poesia di Lucio Piccolo, in “La Clessidra”, III, n. 3, October 1997  
 Stefano Jacomuzzi, “La lente della letteratura. Scritti giornalistici”, Alessandria, Edizioni dell'Orso, 1998    
 Un vano balletto sul ciglio del Nulla. La poesia di Angelo Maria Ripellino, “La Clessidra”, IV,  n. 1, March 1998
 Angelo Jacomuzzi poeta nella “Grotta d'Elia”, ivi, IV, n. 2, June 1998
 Intorno al “Laberinto d'amore” di Giorgio Bàrberi Squarotti, ivi, VI, n. 1, April 1999
 Il labirinto e l'Altrove: la poesia di Luciano Erba, ivi, V, n. 2, October 1999
 La poesia di Giorgio Luzzi nel “nero” della Storia, ivi, VI, n. 1, April 2000
 Versi giocosi e satirici di Mario Marchisio. Un universo ironicamente rovesciato, in “Hebenon”, VI, nn. 7-8, April–October 2001
 Nove poesie inedite di Angelo Jacomuzzi. Appunti di lettura, in “La Clessidra”, VII, n. 1, April 2001
 Dal nostro inviato nelle tenebre (lettura di “Notizie dalla vita” di Giorgio Bárberi  Squarotti), in “Hebenon”, nn. 7-8, April–October 2001
 La poesia di Liana De Luca tra ombre della memoria, malessere esistenziale e colto divertissement ironico-parodico, in “La Clessidrea”, VIII, n. 1, April 2002
 Intervista a Giorgio Luzzi, in “Hebenon”, VII, nn. 9-10, April–October 2002
 Angelo Jacomuzzi, Undici poesie inedite dal “Quaderno delle giovanili (1944-1949)”, in “La Clessidra”, VIII, n. 2, November 2002
 Ciro Di Maria, Il pellicano e la clessidra. Scritti di chimica letteraria (preface by Gian Paolo Caprettini), Alessandria, Edizioni dell'Orso, 2002
 Viaggio alla frontiera del Non-Essere: la poesia di Giorgio Caproni, in “Hebenon”, VIII, n. 1, 2003
 Giorgio Bàrberi Squarotti, Le Langhe e i sogni, Novi Ligure, Ediz. Joker, 2003
 Emanuele Ocelli, Oltre lo specchio. Dissonanze, contrappunti e note di passaggio (preface byLionello Sozzi), Alessandria, Edizioni dell'Orso, 2004
 Stefano Jacomuzzi, Il male senza parole e altri racconti, Novi Ligure, Edizioni Joker, 2004   
 Emanuele Ocelli, Il paginista, ibidem, 2004
 Il viaggio misteriosofico di Bartolo Cattafi (con inediti cattafiani commentati in appendice), in “Hebenon”, X, n. 4, May 2005
 Francesco Granatiero, Bbommine. Fiori d'asfodelo, Novi Ligure, Ediz. Joker, 2006
 Nelle solitudine ghiacciate, negli spazi bianchi e senza echi, in AA.VV., “Letteratura e Sport. Per una storia delle olimpiadi” (International Conference reports, Alessandria-S. Salvatore Monferrato, 18–20 May 2005), Novara, Interlinea, 2006 
 Luciano Erba e la metafisica del “niente” quotidiano, in “Hebenon”, AA. XI-XII, nn.7-8, November 2006
 L'ombra e gli specchi: disintegrazione del personaggio-io nel romanzo “L'amore è niente” di Mario Lattes, in AA. VV.,  Conference reports:  “Mario Lattes, Narrativa e Questioni di Cultura” (Torino, 18–20 November 2005), Torino, Ediz. Fondazione M. Lattes, 2007
 Journey of the Frontier of Non-Being: the Poetry of Giorgio Caproni, translated from the Italian by Ned Condini, in “Chelsea” (New Jork), nn. 82-83, November 2007
 “Come si strappa il cuore” di Karel Šiktank. Un magico-tragico universo poetico, in “Hebenon”, XII, n. 9, November 2007
 Stefano Jacomuzzi, La scrittura felice. Risvolti e altri elzeviri, Alessandria, Edizioni dell'Orso, 2007
 Nella “buia danza” dell'esistenza. Appunti sulla poesia di Alfredo de Palchi, in AA.VV.,  “Alfredo de Palchi: la potenza della poesia”, edited by Roberto Bertoldo, Alessandria, Edizioni dell'Orso, 2008
 Giorgio Luzzi: Il caos e la forma (su “Sciame di pietra”, Donzelli, 2009), in “Istmi”, nn. 25-26, June 2010.

Bibliography of critics 

 Giovanna IOLI, “Passaggio a Nord-Est. La Sicilia a Torino, in “Stilos”, 11 April 2000, p. 49
 Elisa CASTORINA, “Di soglia in soglia con alterna chiave”, in “La Clessidra”, A. VI, n. 2. November 2000 (pp. 83–93)
 Luisa RICALDONE, in “E tu Austria. Rappresentazione di un paese nel Novecento letterario italiano”, Milella, Lecce, 2003 (pp 83–85)
 Giorgio BÁRBERI SQUAROTTI, “Postfazione”  Il caso Mozart, Roma, Gremese, 2009 (pp. 211–217) 
 Piero FLECCHIA, “Una descrizione fenomenologica del potere”, in “Avanti!”, 21 March 2009
 Loris Maria MARCHETTI, “Il caso Mozart”, in “Nuova Informazione Bibliografica”, n. 1,  January–March 2010.
 Giovanni TESIO, "Franco Pappalardo La Rosa tra la tentazione del Niente e la speranza della Poesia", in FPLR, "L'orma di Sisifo - Poesie (1962-2012)", Achille e La Tartaruga, Torino, 2017, pp. 7–12.
°Angela Greco, Rileggendo "Farandoletta - Un sogno in Sicilia" di Franco Pappalardo La Rosa, ne "Il sasso nello stagno" di AnGre76. 20 dicembre 2019.

Living people
1941 births
Italian male writers